The Christian Medical College and Hospital is a private, minority-run teaching hospital in Ludhiana, India.

Founded in 1894, it was then the first medical school for women in Asia.

History
Medical missionary work in Ludhiana was begun in 1881 by Scottish evangelist sisters Martha Rose Greenfield and Kay Greenfield. Dame Edith Mary Brown joined them in 1893. The following year they established the North Indian School of Medicine for Christian Women. In 1964, the Department of Medicine attained the requisite number of teachers and services to the extent that it was upgraded to train postgraduates in medicine, leading to the M.D. degree. At present the college offers both speciality and superspeciality degrees in all major speciality and superspeciality services and is affiliated to Baba Farid University of Health Sciences.

Hospital services
The hospital provides a wide variety of services, ranging from primary peripheral care to superspecialty care. Departments and services include Anesthesia and Critical Care, Clinical Psychology, Dermatology, ENT, Gynaecology and Obstetrics, Internal Medicine and Specialties, Ophthalmology, Orthopaedics, Pediatrics, Psychiatry, Physiotherapy, Radiation Therapy and surgical specialties. Superspecialty services like Cardiology, Cardio Thoracic Surgery, Neurosurgery, Oncology, Neonatology, Neurology, Nephrology, Pediatric Surgery, Plastic Surgery & Microsurgery and Urology & Transplantation and Clinical Hematology.
The hospital's Psychiatry Department is combating the substance abuse crisis in Punjab. The department offers de-addiction services and has found that most patients are between 20 and 30 years old and are addicted to anything from cough syrup and heroin to cocaine and alcohol.

Community services
CMC Ludhiana provides health care and education in urban and rural communities through clinics and medical camps. A dedicated Rural Health Outreach Programme (RHOP) has been in place since April 2003. This new initiative has started to provide a network of health services in the rural belts around Ludhiana in conjunction with village panchayats, local trusts and other local organizations. A monthly psychiatric clinic is held at Missionaries of Charity, a home for mentally disabled children.
Clinics in surrounding villages like Lalton Kalan, Rauwal, Malsihan Bhaike, Hambran are organized and managed under this program. The social and preventive medicine (SPM) department is very active in this program. Community health centers in nearby areas which provide basic health care are managed by this department. Students and physicians are regularly posted in these centers.

Academics 
CMC Ludhiana has the following colleges associated with it:

 Christian Medical College
 Christian Dental College
 Christian Nursing College
 College of Physiotherapy
 Institute of Allied Health Sciences

CMC Ludhiana offers more than 50 courses in medical stream including MBBS, BDS and Bsc Nursing. All these courses include undergraduate, post graduate and doctoral courses. It also awards post graduate diplomas in many fields.

National Faculty Development and FAIMER activities 
The Foundation for Advancement of International Medical Education and Research (FAIMER), USA and the Medical Council of India have recognized the institution as a nodal center for faculty development. More than 1000 teachers from various medical colleges have been trained so far through these initiatives.

The FAIMER regional institute holds its sessions in February every year and enrolls 20 Fellows for intensive training in educational methods and educational leadership.

Rankings

The National Institutional Ranking Framework (NIRF) ranked CMC Ludhiana 18 among medical colleges in India in 2020. CMC Ludhiana is ranked 28th by India Today in 2020.

Notable alumni
 Abraham Thomas - plastic and reconstructive surgeon, specializing in microsurgery and former director.
 Forrest C. Eggleston - former director
 George Kovoor - neurosurgeon and the Director & Chairman of Kovoor Institute of Neuro-Sciences (KINS)

See also
 Christian Medical College & Hospital, Vellore
 Ida S. Scudder

References

Bibliography
 Francesca French, Miss Brown's hospital: the story of the Ludhiana Medical College and Dame Edith Brown, O.B.E., its founder, London: Hodder and Stoughton, 1954.

External links 
 Official Website

Education in Ludhiana
Medical colleges in Punjab, India
Universities and colleges in Punjab, India
Women's universities and colleges in Punjab, India
Educational institutions established in 1894
1894 establishments in India